The Liberal Revolution of 1895 took place in Ecuador, and was a period of radical social and political upheaval. The Revolution started on June 5, 1895 and ultimately resulted in the overthrow of the conservative government, which had ruled Ecuador for several decades, by the Radical Liberals, led by Eloy Alfaro. After the revolution, the new government legalized divorce, allowed religious freedom, and weakened the authority of the Church, which lost the land it held.

The Revolution is often seen as marking the birth of modern Ecuador, with a new power structure that favored the Liberal Party, and new infrastructure projects such as the construction of a railway line between Quito and Guayaquil.

Citations

References
Handelsman, Michael. Culture and Customs of Ecuador. Westport: Greenwood Press, 2000. 
Roos, Wilma and Van Renterghem, Omer. Ecuador: a guide to the people, politics and culture. Northampton: Interlink Books, 2000.

External links
History of Ecuador

History of Ecuador
1895 in Ecuador
19th-century revolutions
June 1895 events
Conflicts in 1895
Revolutions in Ecuador